The Haglere or Hagleren is a mountain of the Emmental Alps, located on the border between the cantons of Lucerne and Obwalden. It overlooks Sörenberg on its south side.

References

External links
 Haglere on Hikr

Mountains of the Alps
Mountains of the canton of Lucerne
Mountains of Obwalden
Lucerne–Obwalden border
Emmental Alps
One-thousanders of Switzerland
Mountains of Switzerland